We Are Little Barrie is the debut album from Little Barrie, released in 2005. They recorded the album over 23 weeks at producer Edwyn Collins’ West Heath Studios. Among the gear used in the studio were a ’62 Gibson ES-330, a Traynor Studio Mate, a Gretsch Chet Atkins and a Fender ’69 Vibralux 2x10. The mics were mostly old Neumanns—although the odd [Shure] SM57 was used, as well.

Track listing
"Free Salute" – 3:51
"Burned Out" – 3:33
"Greener Pastures" – 3:36
"Be the One" – 3:50
"Please Tell Me" – 4:19
"Well and Truly Done" – 4:07
"Stone Reprise" – 1:03
"Stones Throw" – 2:46
"Long Hair" – 3:10
"Thinking on the Mind" – 3:29
"Move on So Easy" – 5:38
"Living in and Out of Place" – 5:09
"Freeprise" – 2:05
All songs written & arranged by Little Barrie.

Personnel

Little Barrie
Barrie Cadogan – guitars, vocals, piano (5), electronic organ (9)
Wayne Fullwood – drums, vocals, piano (5), melodica & xylophone (10)
Lewis Wharton – bass guitar

Additional musicians
Edwyn Collins - electronic organ (2, 13), additional keys (2), Fender Rhodes bass (4), guitar (7) backing vocals (4,9),  record producer
Seb Lewsley - synthesizer (10), sound engineer

Production
Production: Edwyn Collins & Little Barrie
Engineered by Seb Lewsley
Mastering: Chris Potter at Alchemy
Recording: West Heath Studios

References

External links
Free Salute video
Guitar Player interview

2005 debut albums
Little Barrie albums
Artemis Records albums